The discography of Danna Paola, Mexican actress and singer, consists of six studio albums, two extended plays (EP's), one live album, two video albums, two compilation albums, five soundtracks, and forty-five singles.

Albums

Studio albums

Live albums

Video albums

Compilation albums

Karaoke albums

Extended plays

Soundtracks

DVDs

Singles

2000s

2010s and 2020s

Footnotes

As featured artist

Promotional singles

Other appearances

References 

Latin pop music discographies
Discographies of Mexican artists